Zang Toi (born 11 June 1961) is a Malaysian designer of Chinese descent, based in New York City.

Early life
He was born to an ethnic Hainanese family in the Kuala Krai district in the state of Kelantan, Malaysia on 11 June 1961.
Toi left Malaysia at the age of eighteen, and via Toronto, arrived in Manhattan a year later. There he attended Parsons School of Design and apprenticed with Mary Jane Marcasiano and Ronaldus Shamask. In 1989, with a modest collection of bright sarongs, strong suits and regal dresses, he opened his own atelier.

Achievements
In 1991, Toi won the Mouton-Cadet Young Designers Award, surprising many considering the competition he faced that day. His most recent award of distinction was presented by New York City Public Advocate Mark J. Green for Toi's artistic contributions and achievements. In March 1997, Toi was awarded a knighthood by the Sultan of Kelantan. Mr. Toi is also a recipient of The International Center in New York's Award of Excellence.

In 2013, he was awarded the title of Datuk by the King of Malaysia.

Business
Toi has served several style arbiters including Sharon Stone, Patti LaBelle, Ivana Trump, Hazelle Goodman, Kelly Preston, Kirstie Alley, Jennifer Tilly, Jill Zarin, Meg Ryan, and Fergie from The Black Eyed Peas. Be it the House of Toi signature collection or the "Z" collection, his moderately priced bridge line, Toi's creations are marketed as original and feminine pieces.

Zang Toi is available in fine stores globally including the Couture Department at Nordstrom, fine specialty boutiques and Zang Toi Boutiques in Malaysia.

Zang Toi launched his new line of fine makeup with Amazingcosmetics at his Spring 2013 runway show.

Partnerships
In most of his fashion shows, Toi has employed the services of another famous Malaysian, Ling Tan, whose career he helped to kick-start.

Summary
Awards Received: 1990 Mouton Cadet Young Designer Award
Brand names/Divisions: Zang Toi

See also
 Chinese people in New York City
 Malaysian Chinese

References

External links

Zang Toi

1961 births
Living people
Malaysian people of Chinese descent
People from Kelantan
Parsons School of Design alumni
Malaysian fashion designers
Malaysian businesspeople